The list of ship launches in 1688 includes a chronological list of some ships launched in 1688.


References

1688
Ship launches